Anders Blume (born December 7, 1985) is a Danish Counter-Strike: Global Offensive commentator and co-founder of RoomOnFire. He has been present as a caster at all of the Valve sponsored CS:GO Majors, with the exception of EMS One Katowice 2014. He has worked for a wide variety of tournament organisers including Electronic Sports League (ESL), Dreamhack and Gfinity. He is more often than not paired with Auguste 'Semmler' Massonnat, also a co-founder of RoomOnFire and Jason "Moses" O'Toole, for his casts. He is famous for his energetic casts, including the use of what has become his catchphrase, "Are you kidding me?". In 2015, he won the Golden Joystick award for esports icon of the year.

Esports commentary

Blume's entry into commentary stemmed from his dissatisfaction with the commentators at the time he played the game. He was unsatisfied with how they described the game, in particular their failure to acknowledge the use of flashes, smoke, and grenades as a tactical element.

Blume had his first live-streamed cast in January 2013 on a Twitch channel called pugcasts. His popularity grew quickly and he was soon invited to join NiPTV, a branch of the Ninjas in Pyjamas organisation. He began to cast at LAN events soon after. His first event was a local Danish event called the Blast 2013. Soon after this, Anders had his first major break at a large event with his selection as a commentator for DreamHack Summer 2013. At the time, the event had the second highest prize-pool in the game's history. Another commentator at the event, Auguste Massonnat, would go on to become a regular fixture of any NiPTV broadcast.

To date, Anders has been part of the commentary team for the grand finals at 10 out of the 17 Valve sponsored majors.

RoomOnFire

In July 2014, Anders officially left NiPTV to build his own brand, RoomOnFire, alongside Semmler. Initially, the only other member of the organization was Halvor "vENdetta" Gulestøl. In the beginning they ran their own weekly online cups in partnership with Caseking.de called the CaseKing of the Hill. These cups ran weekly featuring a variety of different top teams.  The series of cups culminated with an eight team online invitational tournament called the CaseKing of Kings. Among the invited were several of the winners of the previous cups.

The duo of Anders and Semmler signed an exclusivity deal with Twitch in April 2015 as part of a larger acquisition of talent including former NiP player Robin "Fifflaren" Johansson and the current Professional player, Spencer "Hiko" Martin.

Semmler revealed on his personal Ask.fm page that the North American section of the organization was being run by Matthew "Sadokist" Trivett, a Canadian commentator who rose to prominence in early 2015 when PGL brought him out to Bucharest to commentate their Kickoff season.

As a method of raising funds and providing a method for the community to support the organization, together with artists known as Hanzo and Coyote, they uploaded a variety of in-game weapon skins to the Steam Workshop. Since then, two of these items have been added to the game.

In 2015 they stopped organizing their own online cups. This was caused by the large number of other online leagues and offline events that happened throughout the year. Top teams lacked the time to participate due to commitments to other larger, leagues.

In 2019, after former Fifflaren and other former people associated with NiP spoke out about disagreements with the organisation, Blume publicly supported people with knowledge to speak up.

Notable Events Attended

Dreamhack Summer 2013
Dreamhack Winter 2013
ESL One Katowice 2014
ESL One Cologne 2014
Dreamhack Winter 2014
ESL One Katowice 2015
Dreamhack Open Tour 2015
ESL One Cologne 2015
DreamHack Open Cluj-Napoca 2015
MLG Columbus 2016
ESL One Cologne 2016
ELeague Major 2017
PGL Major: Kraków 2017
ELEAGUE Major: Boston 2018
FACEIT Major: London 2018
ESL One Cologne 2019
StarLadder Major: Berlin 2019
Intel Extreme Masters (IEM) Katowice 2020
BLAST Premier Global Final 2020
PGL Major Stockholm 2021
BLAST Premier Fall Final 2021
IEM Cologne 2022

Reputation
Blume has been referred to as the voice of Counter-Strike: Global Offensive due to his overwhelming presence as a commentator for the game. Blume has become a figure of interest partially due to his energetic style of casting, in addition to his deliverance of the phrase "Are you kidding me!". So much so that compilations of him saying it have enjoyed mainstream success on YouTube, with as many as over a million views.

Anders picked up the nickname of "The General" after the ESL One Katowice 2015 major due to the large collection of CS:GO related pins he had attached to the blazer he was wearing at the event. People immediately drew similarity between the pins and medals such that a general might have.

In 2015, Blume won the Golden Joystick award for esports icon of the year. In 2018, Blume was nominated for Best Esports Host by The Game Awards, losing out to Sjokz.

Criticism
At the beginning of his career, Blume was the target of criticism from people "for not living up to the high standards set by Counter-Strike stalwarts Joe Miller and Paul Chaloner".

Personal life
Blume is married and has a son and a daughter. He attended the University of Copenhagen to study physics before transferring to biology and then finally English; he eventually dropped out. During this time he also worked part-time on the development of databases for a local company, but did not further this due to the amount of time required by casting. Alongside his indecision in regards to his education, he would also constantly switch between a variety of hobbies and other projects.

Early life
Blume spent his childhood in the small suburb of Farum. His interest in gaming developed at a young age, attending late-night Internet cafes with his friends to play Counter-Strike as a 13-year old. He has since described one train journey home from Copenhagen after one such session in the summer of 1999 to be an especially treasured childhood memory. In his own words, "I think [then] I realized that we really had something with this game."

References

Sports commentators
Esports commentators
Living people
1985 births
Place of birth missing (living people)
University of Copenhagen alumni
People from Furesø Municipality
Counter-Strike

Nordsjællands Grundskole og Gymnasium